Belitong Football Club (simply known as Belitong FC or BFC) is an Indonesian football club based in Tanjung Pandan, Belitung. They currently compete in the Liga 3.

Honours
 Liga 3 Bangka Belitung Islands
 Champion: 2021

References

External links
 

Football clubs in Bangka Belitung Islands
Football clubs in Indonesia
Association football clubs established in 2011
2011 establishments in Indonesia